In geometry, a 9-orthoplex or 9-cross polytope, is a regular 9-polytope with 18 vertices, 144 edges,  672 triangle faces, 2016 tetrahedron cells, 4032 5-cells 4-faces, 5376 5-simplex 5-faces, 4608 6-simplex 6-faces, 2304 7-simplex 7-faces, and 512 8-simplex 8-faces.

It has two constructed forms, the first being regular with Schläfli symbol {37,4}, and the second with alternately labeled (checkerboarded) facets, with Schläfli symbol {36,31,1} or Coxeter symbol 611.

It is one of an infinite family of polytopes, called cross-polytopes or orthoplexes. The dual polytope is the 9-hypercube or enneract.

Alternate names
 Enneacross, derived from combining the family name cross polytope with ennea for nine (dimensions) in Greek
 Pentacosidodecayotton as a 512-facetted 9-polytope (polyyotton)

Construction 

There are two Coxeter groups associated with the 9-orthoplex, one regular, dual of the enneract with the C9 or [4,37] symmetry group, and a lower symmetry with two copies of 8-simplex facets, alternating, with the D9 or [36,1,1] symmetry group.

Cartesian coordinates 
Cartesian coordinates for the vertices of a 9-orthoplex, centered at the origin, are
 (±1,0,0,0,0,0,0,0,0), (0,±1,0,0,0,0,0,0,0), (0,0,±1,0,0,0,0,0,0), (0,0,0,±1,0,0,0,0,0), (0,0,0,0,±1,0,0,0,0), (0,0,0,0,0,±1,0,0,0), (0,0,0,0,0,0,±1,0,0), (0,0,0,0,0,0,0,±1,0), (0,0,0,0,0,0,0,0,±1)

Every vertex pair is connected by an edge, except opposites.

Images

References
 H.S.M. Coxeter: 
 H.S.M. Coxeter, Regular Polytopes, 3rd Edition, Dover New York, 1973 
 Kaleidoscopes: Selected Writings of H.S.M. Coxeter, edited by F. Arthur Sherk, Peter McMullen, Anthony C. Thompson, Asia Ivic Weiss, Wiley-Interscience Publication, 1995,  
 (Paper 22) H.S.M. Coxeter, Regular and Semi Regular Polytopes I, [Math. Zeit. 46 (1940) 380-407, MR 2,10]
 (Paper 23) H.S.M. Coxeter, Regular and Semi-Regular Polytopes II, [Math. Zeit. 188 (1985) 559-591]
 (Paper 24) H.S.M. Coxeter, Regular and Semi-Regular Polytopes III, [Math. Zeit. 200 (1988) 3-45]
 Norman Johnson Uniform Polytopes, Manuscript (1991)
 N.W. Johnson: The Theory of Uniform Polytopes and Honeycombs, Ph.D.

External links 

 Polytopes of Various Dimensions
 Multi-dimensional Glossary

9-polytopes